The , or JNN, is a Japanese commercial television network run by TBS Television. The network's responsibility includes the syndication of national television news bulletins to its regional affiliates, and news exchange between the stations. Its member stations also broadcast non-news programs originating from TBS Television.

It also operates the 24-hour satellite and cable news channel TBS News.

Japan News Network stations
Bold indicates founding members

Former stations
Bold indicates former primary affiliate

References

External links
 Official Site

 
24-hour television news channels in Japan
Television channels and stations established in 1959